Astragalus hystrix is a species of milkvetch in the family Fabaceae. It is a perennial, non-climbing shrub.

Habitat 
Astragalus hystrix naturally grows in Southeast Turkey and Northwest Iran.

References

hystrix